Brian Strange (born 29 January 1954) is a British weightlifter. He competed in the men's heavyweight event at the 1976 Summer Olympics.

References

1954 births
Living people
British male weightlifters
Olympic weightlifters of Great Britain
Weightlifters at the 1976 Summer Olympics
Place of birth missing (living people)
20th-century British people